Mount Cope is a bluff-type mountain on the east side of Separation Range, Queen Maud Mountains. It was mapped by the United States Geological Survey from surveys and from U.S. Navy aerial photographs, 1958–63, and named by the Advisory Committee on Antarctic Names for Lieutenant Ronald P. Cope, U.S. Navy, Officer-in-Charge of the nuclear power plant at McMurdo Station, 1963.

References 

Mountains of the Ross Dependency
Dufek Coast